Martin Joseph Beckmann (5 July 1924, Ratingen, Germany – 11 April 2017) was a professor for Economics and Applied Mathematics. He was professor at the University of Chicago, Yale University and Brown University, as well as the University of Bonn and Technische Universität München. He received honorary degrees from the University of Karlsruhe, the Umeå University and the University of the Bundeswehr Hamburg. He was president of the European Regional Science Association and received the Regional Science Founders Medal in 1983. His research spans a wide field in spatial analysis and regional economics, with a special focus on transport economics.

Martin Beckmann established basic principles for user behavior on congested transportation networks, as well as for optimal network vehicle flows, when user choices are respectively uncoordinated or coordinated. Beckmann’s contribution launched the new subfield of transportation network economics.

Further reading

References

External links
 Founder's medal: Martin J. Beckmann

1924 births
2017 deaths
German economists
Brown University faculty
Regional economists
Fellows of the Econometric Society
Helmut Schmidt University alumni
German expatriates in the United States
Yale University faculty
University of Chicago faculty